The Pride of Spitalfields (formerly The Romford Arms) is a public house at 3 Heneage Street in Spitalfields in the East End of London, just off Brick Lane. It was associated with a Jack the Ripper suspect.

History 

The pub has existed since at least the middle of the 19th century, if not always under that name. Heneage Street itself appears to have been created between 1802 and 1822 according to available maps.

In the 1889 Post Office Trade Directory, 3 Heneage Street, on the north side of the road, was listed as a Beer Retailer, with proprietor James Stewart.  The adjacent site to the east, 5 Heneage Street, now a house and artist's studio, was the site of the Best & Co. brewery, which closed in 1902.

Jack the Ripper 

One of the suspects named by researchers, James Hardiman, a 'cats meat vendor', lived at 13 Heneage Street, and drank at the Romford Arms.

Another, more notable, witness and Ripper suspect, George Hutchinson, made statements that some researchers have suggested he had been drinking at The Romford Arms on the night of 9 November 1888 prior to meeting one of the victims.

Modern era 

The pub's name changed from The Romford Arms sometime between 1983  and 1986 according to contemporary publications.

David Gray filmed his music video for Sail Away in the pub in 1998.

In 2003, the pub was damaged in a petrol bomb attack.

In 2013, it was awarded "East London Pub of the Year" by CAMRA - the Campaign for Real Ale - an award shared with the Eleanor Arms, Bow.

References

Jack the Ripper
Pubs in the London Borough of Tower Hamlets
History of the London Borough of Tower Hamlets
Tourist attractions in the London Borough of Tower Hamlets
Spitalfields